The following lists events that happened during 1996 in Sri Lanka.

Incumbents
President: Chandrika Kumaratunga
Prime Minister: Sirimavo Bandaranaike
Chief Justice: G. P. S. de Silva

Governors
 Central Province – E. L. Senanayake 
 North Central Province – Maithripala Senanayake 
 North Eastern Province – Gamini Fonseka 
 North Western Province – Hector Arawwawala 
 Sabaragamuwa Province – C. N. Saliya Mathew 
 Southern Province – Neville Kanakeratne 
 Uva Province – Ananda Dassanayake 
 Western Province – K. Vignarajah

Chief Ministers
 Central Province – W. M. P. B. Dissanayake 
 North Central Province – G. D. Mahindasoma (until 2 May); Jayasena Dissanayake (starting 2 May)
 North Western Province – Nimal Bandara 
 Sabaragamuwa Province – Jayatilake Podinilame 
 Southern Province – Mahinda Yapa Abeywardena 
 Uva Province – Percy Samaraweera
 Western Province – Susil Premajayanth

Events
 Sri Lanka wins the 1996 Cricket World Cup beating Australia by 7 wickets, making this Sri Lanka's first ever world cup win.
 The LTTE unleashes Operation Unceasing Waves, following a series of losses in the Jaffna Peninsula, the Liberation Tigers of Tamil Elam, launch an attack on Mullaitivu. The Sri Lankan Army is defeated leaving 1,242 SLA soldiers dead, and hundreds captured and executed. It has also been reported that others were found dead clutching white flags of surrender.
 On July 24, 1996, a train is bombed in Dehiwala, killing 42 and wounding 400. The LTTE was claimed responsible for the attack, placing suitcase bombs in four carriages on a commuter train.

Notes 

a.  Gunaratna, Rohan. (1998). Pg.353, Sri Lanka's Ethnic Crisis and National Security, Colombo: South Asian Network on Conflict Research.

References